Como Tu Mujer (English: As Your Woman) is the title of a studio album released by Spanish performer Rocío Dúrcal on 29 October 1988 by BMG Ariola. Written and produced by Mexican singer-songwriter Marco Antonio Solís, this would be the first album produced by Solís for the singer.

Its lead single (Como Tu Mujer) became a hit all over Latin America and in the United States where it went on to number-one for 10 consecutive weeks on the Billboard Hot Latin Tracks, considered by many to be one of her most successful singles. This album earned her many awards such as the Premio Aplauso FM 98, given by Spanish Broadcasting System, in Los Angeles, California and Premio TV y Novelas for "Best Female Artist".

Track listing

Personnel 
Musicians
Rocío Durcal – Vocals
Marco Antonio Solís – Vocals
Marco Antonio Solís – Writer, composer

Production
Producer: Marco Antonio Solís
Arrangers: Homero Patrón, Marco Antonio Solís
Engineer: Sergio García
Assistant engineers: Andy Waterman, Shawn Micheal
Recorded in studies: Ocean Way Recording Studios, Hollywood, CA.
Label: Ariola, BMG Music (LP) (CD), RCA Records (Cassette)
Manufactured and Distributed by: BMG Music y Ariola International.

Charts 

Chart positions

 Billboard Singles

 Billboard Albums

References 

1988 albums
Rocío Dúrcal albums